Harold W. Thimbleby (born 19 July 1955) is a British  professor of computer science at Swansea University, Wales. He is known for his works on user interface design within the realm of human computer interaction.

Overview 

Harold Thimbleby held the post of director of UCLIC, University College London's Interaction Centre, from its establishment in 2001. From 2001 to 2004, he was also the 28th Professor of Geometry at Gresham College, London. Thimbleby founded the Future Interaction Technology Lab at Swansea University in 2005.

Thimbleby runs the Swansea University Research Forum, as well as giving talks on science and religion.

Research interests 
Thimbleby's research interests include:

 Interactive handwriting calculators
 Improving medical devices 
 Improving ethics in research 
 Markov Modeling 
 Matrix Modeling

Selected works 
 Article on literate programming,1986 (Winner of the British Computer Society Wilkes Award.)
 User Interface Design, Addison-Wesley, 1990.
 HyperProgramming, with G. F. Coulouris, Addison-Wesley, 1990.
 Press On, MIT Press, 2007. (Winner, in the Computer and Information Sciences category, of the Association of American Publishers' Publishing Awards for Excellence competition.)
 The Diversity and Ethics, with Paul Cairns, University College London Interaction Center.

References

External links 
 Harold Thimbleby home page
 

1955 births
Living people
British computer scientists
Human–computer interaction researchers
Academics of University College London
Academics of Swansea University
Professors of Gresham College